Nana Twum Barimah, also known as Dr. Rokoto, is a Ghanaian film and television actor and comedian who has contributed to the growth of the film industry. He co-hosted By the Fireside with Maame Dokono on GTV in the 1990s and early 2000s.

Career 
He has featured in movies and television series like Obra and co-hosted by the fireside with Mame Dokono, he also was a radio presenter at New York were he discussed social, domestic and health issues blended with comedy, he also worked with Waterproof on various comedy concerts. He is currently the Chief of Aperade in the Eastern Region.

Filmography 

 Obra
 Coming To Ghana
 By the Fireside (Ghanaian TV program)

References 

Living people
Ghanaian comedians
Ghanaian film actors
Ghanaian television actors
Year of birth missing (living people)